Mark Pritchard may refer to:
 Mark Pritchard (footballer) (born 1985), Welsh footballer
 Mark Pritchard (music producer), British electronic music producer
 Mark Pritchard (politician) (born 1966), British Conservative Member of Parliament (MP) for The Wrekin since 2005